Tina Rose Muña Barnes (born August 24, 1962) is a Guamanian politician, currently serving as her 7th term as a senator in the Guam Legislature. She formerly served as the Speaker of the 35th Guam Legislature from 2019 to 2021.

Family
Tina Muña Barnes, born August 24, 1962, is the daughter of William Pereira "Bill" Muña and Ana Atoigue "Ann" Muña.

Career
Barnes has worked for Public Defender Service Corporation, the Law Office of Brooks and Klitzkie, Atkins Kroll Toyota, and Guam Autospot. Barnes was appointed by Governor Carl T.C. Gutierrez to serve as Deputy Director of the Department of Integrated Services for Individuals with Disabilities.

Personal life
Tina is an athlete, having played softball, basketball and volleyball in Guam, and for teams representing Guam at the South Pacific and Oceania Games in 1987, 1989 and 1991. She was a South Pacific Games Commission member in Tahiti in 1995, and Guam basketball tournament director in the 1994 Micronesian Games. She is married to baseball member Jacob Cruz "Jake" Barnes and have four children (Tiffany, Coby, Jathan and Minna), including five grandchildren.

Guam Legislature

Elections
Barnes was elected to the 27th Guam Legislature in the General Election of 2002. In the 2004 election, she failed to win reelection, but Barnes won a seat in the 2006 election and remained in the legislature for 5 consecutive terms. She failed to win reelection in 2016, but Barnes returned to the Guam Legislature after winning a seat in the 35th Guam Legislature, where she is currently serving as Speaker. In addition to becoming Speaker of the Guam Legislature, Muña Barnes also serves as the Oversight Chairwoman for the Committee on Public Accountability, Human Resources and the Guam Buildup.

Speakership 
Speaker Tina Rose Muña Barnes was elected as Speaker by a majority of her Democratic Caucus, after shoring up more votes from her colleagues compared to Acting Speaker Therese Terlaje. During her tenure as Speaker of the 35th Guam Legislature, and focused on improving the economy of Guam, Muña Barnes focused on implementing many of the revenue generating laws that she had passed in her tenure in the Guam Legislature.

War Claims 

During her first year as Speaker of the 35th Guam Legislature, coinciding with the 75th year of Guam's Liberation, Speaker Muña Barnes advocated for the compensation of Guam's World War II survivors who were abused during the Japanese occupation of Guam. The Speaker, along with Legislative Secretary Amanda Shelton and Minority Leader William Castro introduced legislation July 2019 to pay off living compensable Guam victims with adjudicated claims. At the request of Guam's Delegate to Congress, Congressman Michael F.Q. San Nicolas, discussion on this matter was stalled. After months of waiting, Speaker Muña Barnes had called the Guam Legislature into session to address her War Claims Bill. On December 20, 2019, the Speaker's measure was voted on in the Guam Legislature, which passed by a vote of 12-3 to pass. 

Surrounded by a roomful of World War II survivors, on January 3, 2020, Speaker Muña Barnes's local legislation to pay war claims was signed into law by Governor Lourdes A. Leon Guerrero. Bill 181-35, the Speaker's War Claims Bill was signed into law as Public Law 35-61.

Public Policy Institute 
As Speaker of the 35th Guam Legislature, Speaker Muña Barnes introduced legislation to create the Public Policy Institute. Having seen the successes of the program in her previous terms, Muña Barnes felt that it was her responsibility to train the leaders of tomorrow. The Public Policy Institute provides interns exposure to a vast network of leaders in the public and private sectors as well as to an array of professional and training opportunities for them to gain leadership, research, and work place skills and experiences. The Institute is a unique and rigorous program where interns have the opportunity to learn first-hand about the island’s legislative process by participating in a variety of activities from bill research and writing, organizing and conducting public policy briefings, paging, and by providing executive-level staffing. Interns may also respond to constituent inquiries, draft correspondence, and assist with general office operations. Promising students are selected from public and private schools on Guam and are placed in various offices of the Guam Legislature for an eight week period over the fall, spring, or summer terms. Interns meet with distinguished leaders from a range of professional backgrounds. Interns also take field-trips to other branches of government in order gain a broader understanding of the three branches of government. For the 2019 cohort, 10 students from Guam's Public and Private High Schools graduated with distinction.

References

External links
 Guam Legislature Official Website

|-

1962 births
21st-century American politicians
21st-century American women politicians
Chamorro people
Guamanian Democrats
Guamanian people of Spanish descent
Guamanian Roman Catholics
Guamanian women in politics
Living people
Members of the Legislature of Guam
Speakers of the Legislature of Guam